SuperSport United Football Club (often known as SuperSport) is a South African professional football club based in Atteridgeville in Pretoria in the Gauteng province. The team currently plays in the Dstv Premiership. United is known as Matsatsantsa a Pitori amongst its supporters. They usually play their home games at Lucas Moripe Stadium in Atteridgeville.

History
 Supersport F.C. is an association football club wholly owned by SuperSport, the South African group of television channels.

The club was originally known as Pretoria City. City was purchased by M-Net in 1994. M-Net got approval from the National Soccer League and the club was renamed.

The club comprises a professional football team affiliated to the Premier Soccer League as well as various youth academy teams in the SuperSport United Youth Academy playing within their respective SAFA structures.

Home matches are usually played at Lucas Moripe Stadium in Atteridgeville, Pretoria, however in recent times the club has elected to take many matches to the Peter Mokaba Stadium in Polokwane.

The club's youth academy is one of the best in the country. Some of the graduates are Daine Klate, Kermit Erasmus, Ronwen Williams all three from Port Elizabeth and Kamohelo Mokotjo. They have previously been linked with English Premier League side Tottenham Hotspur and Dutch side Feyenoord.

Honours

Domestic competitions 
 Premier Soccer League
 Winners (3): 2007–08, 2008–09, 2009–10
 Nedbank Cup
 Winners (5): 1999, 2005, 2011–12, 2015–16, 2016–17
 Telkom Knockout 
 Winners (1): 2014
 MTN 8  
 Winners (3): 2004, 2017, 2019
 Sparletta Cup
 Winners (1): 1995
 Second Division  
 Winners (1): 1995

Notable former coaches
  Shane McGregor (1998–99)
  Bruce Grobbelaar (1999–01)
  Pitso Mosimane (1 July 2001 – 30 June 2007)
  Gavin Hunt (1 July 2007 – 28 May 2013)
  Cavin Johnson (19 June 2013 – 29 August 2014)
  Kaitano Tembo (29 August 2014 – 3 September 2014)
  Gordon Igesund (3 September 2014– 27 January 2016)
  Stuart Baxter (27 January 2016– 30 June 2017)
  Eric Tinkler (1 July 2017 – 2018)
  Kaitano Tembo (2018 -  12 April 2022)
  Andre Arendse (interim, 12 April 2022 - July 6, 2022)
  Gavin Hunt (7 July 2022 - present)

Club records
Most starts:  Ronald Lawrence 224 (including Pretoria City matches)
Most goals:  Bradley Grobler 58
Most capped player:  Dennis Masina
Most starts in a season:  Siboniso Gaxa 47 (2004–05)
Most goals in a season:  Glen Salmon 16 (1998–99) (previous record: George Koumantarakis 14; 1997–98)
Most tackles in a season: Shandukani Mabudu[Development player] (2017 GDL) 
Record victory: 9–0 v  Red Star Anse-aux-Pins (19 March 2005, CAF Confederation Cup)
Record defeat: 0–5 v  Arcadia 7 April 1990, NSL

Premier Soccer League record
2020–21 – 5th
2019–20 – 5th
2018–19 – 6th
2017–18 – 7th
2016/2017 – 5th
2015/2016 – 8th
2014/2015 – 6th
2013/2014 – 5th
2012/2013 – 6th
2011/2012 – 3rd
2010/2011 – 7th
2009/2010 – 1st
2008/2009 – 1st
2007/2008 – 1st
2006/2007 – 6th
2005/2006 – 7th
2004/2005 – 4th
2003/2004 – 3rd
2002/2003 – 2nd
2001/2002 – 2nd
2000/2001 – 8th
1999/2000 – 10th
1998/1999 – 8th
1997/1998 – 14th
1996/1997 – 9th

PSL record

Coaching staff

Current squad

Shirt sponsor & kit manufacturer
Shirt sponsor:  showmax 
Kit manufacturer: Umbro

References

External links
Official Website of Supersport United Football Club
Premier Soccer League
PSL Club Info
South African Football Association
Confederation of African Football

 
Association football clubs established in 1994
Premier Soccer League clubs
1994 establishments in South Africa
Soccer clubs in Pretoria